Ivy Hill Cemetery is a public cemetery and crematorium located at 1201 Easton Road in the Cedarbrook neighborhood of Philadelphia, Pennsylvania. Chartered in 1867, it is 80 acres in size and was originally named the Germantown and Chestnut Hill Cemetery. It was renamed Ivy Hill Cemetery in June 1871.

The gatehouse is a grand gothic archway and contains a farmhouse chapel.

One cremation unit was installed in 1985 and the number has been expanded to include six cremation units.

One of the notable monuments in the cemetery is of Melville H. Freas. He fought in the American Civil War as a member of the 150th Pennsylvania Infantry Regiment and commissioned a life-size statue of himself in his military uniform to adorn his grave.

Notable burials
 H.W. Ambruster (1879–1961), Rutgers University football coach
 William Law Anderson (1879–1910), professional golfer
 Bill Byrd (1907–1991), professional baseball player
 George Potter Darrow (1859–1943), U.S. congressman
 Mahlon Duckett (1922–2015), professional baseball player
 Charles Edgar Duryea (1861–1939), automotive engineer and inventor
 "Smokin' Joe" Frazier (1944–2011), professional boxer
 L. Fidelia Woolley Gillette (1827–1905), first woman ever ordained a minister in Canada
 Franklin B. Gowen (1836–1889), businessman
 Bill Gray (1871–1932), professional baseball player
 Harold B. Hairston (1940–2016), Philadelphia fire commissioner
 Ed Lafitte (1886–1971), professional baseball player
 Margaret Lawrence (1889–1929), actress
 Thomas McIntosh (1921–2005), Philadelphia city councilman
 Harold Melvin (1939–1997), soul singer
 Acel Moore (1940–2016), Philadelphia Inquirer editor
 Edwin Ward Moore (1810–1865), commodore of the Texas Navy
 Matthew Saad Muhammad (1954–2014), professional boxer
 Francis D. Pastorius (1920–1962), Philadelphia City Treasurer
 Fayette Pinkney (1948–2009), soul singer
 Joni Sledge (1956–2017), pop and disco singer
 William Thompson Russell Smith (1812–1896), landscape painter
 Bill Tilden (1893–1953), professional tennis player
 Lauretha A. Vaird (1952–1996), Philadelphia police officer
 Louis Wagner (1838–1914), U.S. Army general
 Marion Williams (1927–1994), gospel singer
 Joseph Augustus Zarelli (1953–1957), child murder victim; a.k.a., The Boy in the Box

References

External links
 localcemeteries.net – Ivy Hill Cemetery
 
 

Cemeteries established in the 1860s
Cemeteries in Philadelphia
Crematoria in the United States
1867 establishments in Pennsylvania
Olney-Oak Lane, Philadelphia